Hum Sub Chor Hain is the title of several Hindi films:

Ham Sab Chor Hain (1956 film)
Hum Sub Chor Hain (1973 film)
Hum Sub Chor Hain (1995 film)